Teagan Levi  (born 14 August 2003) is an Australian rugby union player who has represented Australia at sevens rugby at the Commonwealth Games. She is the sister of fellow rugby sevens player Maddison Levi.

In October 2021, Levi was drafted to the Gold Coast Suns in the AFL Women's league but opted to join up with the rugby sevens Australian squad instead.

Levi won a gold medal with the Australian sevens team at the 2022 Commonwealth Games in Birmingham. She was a member of the Australian team that won the 2022 Sevens Rugby World Cup held in Cape Town, South Africa in September 2022.

References

2003 births
Living people
Sportspeople from the Gold Coast, Queensland
Sportswomen from Queensland
Australian rules footballers from Queensland
Gold Coast Football Club (AFLW) players
Australian female rugby sevens players
Commonwealth Games gold medallists for Australia
Commonwealth Games medallists in rugby sevens
Rugby sevens players at the 2022 Commonwealth Games
Medallists at the 2022 Commonwealth Games